The Chisholm Commercial Historic District is the historic business district of Chisholm, Minnesota, United States.  It consists of one and two-story commercial buildings as well as some civic buildings and a park, all constructed after a fire on September 5, 1908, destroyed the community's original downtown and before the Wall Street Crash of 1929 put an end to Chisholm's early-20th-century heyday.   The district comprises both sides of Lake Street West between Central Avenue and 4th Avenue West, as well as some properties on the east sides of Central Avenue and 1st Avenue.   It was listed on the National Register of Historic Places in 2016 for its local significance in the themes of commerce, entertainment/recreation, and social history.  The district was nominated for its association with the establishment of Chisholm as an economic, social, and civic hub on the Mesabi Range.

At the time of its National Register nomination, the historic district consisted of 55 contributing properties.  There were also 31 non-contributing properties, either constructed after 1929 or altered in ways that compromised their historical character.

See also
 National Register of Historic Places listings in St. Louis County, Minnesota

References

Buildings and structures in St. Louis County, Minnesota
Central business districts in the United States
Commercial buildings on the National Register of Historic Places in Minnesota
Historic districts on the National Register of Historic Places in Minnesota
National Register of Historic Places in St. Louis County, Minnesota